The AGIPI Billiard Masters was a three-cushion billiards tournament which was held annually in Schiltigheim, France between 2008 and 2013.

In 2008 the invitational tournament for the best three-cushion players in the world has started. The games were broadcast live on the television by Eurosport 2 and streamed on the internet by Kozoom.

The last champion was "The Italian Gentleman" Marco Zanetti, who defeated Frédéric Caudron from Belgium in the final with 50–40 in 30 innings.

Mode 
The first edition was played in four groups of five players. The two best of each group qualified for the final round with two groups of four players. The two group winners qualified for the semifinals, and the semifinal winners contested the final. The game was played to 50 points. Since 2009 the last 8 players played quarter-finals, semi-finals and finals.

The 2012 tournament started with 28 participants. 8 players were set for the two qualifying groups before the quarter-finals. The rest had to qualify through qualifying rounds, a third place was also awarded.

Prize money 
Unlike most other three-cushion billiards tournaments, players of the AGIPI Masters got paid according to a bonus-system. In addition to the fixed sum of prize money for his corresponding ranking, a player could get additional bonus. The following list shows the bonus of the 2013 competition:

Note 
 *1 These bonuses could not be combined

In total
  2008: 121,450 €
  2009: 124,450 €
  2010: 116,800 €
  2011: 127,800 €
  2012: 123,400 €
  2013: 109,600 €

Tournament statistics 
The GA gives the general-average of the player during the tournament. The following numbers show the high-run (HR) and the total prize money (PM).

References

External links 
 

Three-cushion billiards competitions
Recurring sporting events established in 2008
Recurring events disestablished in 2013
Cue sports in France